Eliodoro Bianchi (6 May 1773 – 10 May 1848) was an Italian operatic tenor and later a prominent singing teacher. Born in Cividate al Piano and trained in Naples under Giacomo Tritto, he made his stage debut in 1793. Amongst the many roles, he created during the course of his 40-year career were Baldassare in Ciro in Babilonia and the King of Sweden in Eduardo e Cristina, both of which were composed by Rossini expressly for Bianchi's voice. He retired from the stage in 1835 and spent his later years in Palazzolo sull'Oglio, where he died at the age of 75.

Life and career
Bianchi was born in Cividate al Piano, a town in the Province of Bergamo, to Claudia née Balestra and Massimo Bianchi. He was the youngest of their nine children. The family moved to Palazzolo sull'Oglio near Brescia in 1775 when Massimo Bianchi was appointed the organist for the town's newly completed cathedral. Bianchi received his early musical training from his father and sang as a boy soprano in local churches. Two of his older brothers also became musicians. Cipriano Bianchi (1765-1835) served as the organist for the Church of Santa Maria Assunta in Calcinate. Odoardo Bianchi was a tenor active in Italian theatres from 1784 to 1791 and later at the Imperial Court in Saint Petersburg.

In his late teens, Bianchi was sent to Naples, where he studied singing and composition with Giacomo Tritto. He was twenty years old when he began his stage career as a tenor, appearing at the Teatro Onigo in Treviso during the autumn season of 1793 as Attalo in Tarchi's Ariarate. Over the next four years he sang in the theatres of Padua, Genoa, Modena, Florence, Lucca, and Venice. In 1797, he returned to Naples and appeared in various theatres there until 1801. During this time he sang at the Teatro San Carlo in the premieres of Tritto's Il disinganno, a cantata for three voices and orchestra,  and Luigi Capotorti's Enea in Cartagine, a three-act opera seria.

In 1803, he sang for the entire season at La Scala in Milan, where he became a favourite with the audience and returned there regularly from 1809 to 1814. Outside of Italy, he appeared in Paris in 1801 in a series of concerts at the Temple de Mars on Rue du Bac and at the Salle Favart. He sang in Vienna in 1805 and in Paris and London in 1806–1807. In 1807, Bianchi married Carolina Crespi, an eighteen-year-old soprano whom he met when they were both singing with the Théâtre-Italien in Paris. The couple had two children, Giuseppina and Angelo Eliodoro, both of whom became singers. However, the marriage proved to be an unhappy one, and they eventually separated.

During the course of his career, Bianchi sang a wide repertoire ranging from opera buffa to opera seria and appeared in numerous world premieres. He began his career primarily singing in opera buffas, but from 1812 he came to prominence in the opera seria genre as well. Rossini composed the roles of Baldassare in Ciro in Babilonia and the King of Sweden in Eduardo e Cristina expressly for Bianchi's voice, and also composed special arias for him to sing when he appeared in Aureliano in Palmira.

According to Rodolfo Celletti, Bianchi's voice was baritonal in quality with a beautiful timbre and employed with an excellent technique and eloquent phrasing. Praise of these traits appeared frequently in contemporary Italian press reviews. However, critics for the French journal  Le Moniteur (1806) and the British London Magazine (1820) complained about the baritonal quality of Bianchi's voice, finding his singing "ponderous" and lacking in brilliance.

By 1819, Bianchi had opened a singing school in Milan, although he continued to perform for another 15 years in the opera houses of Italy and occasionally in Austria and England. His students included Elisa Orlandi, Cesare Badiali and Enrico Crivelli. Following the retirement of Antonio Secchi (1761–1833) as professor of singing at the Milan Conservatory in 1832, Bianchi was offered the post, but he turned it down.

Bianchi retired from the stage in 1835. His last performances were in Livorno as Sempronio in Pietro Generali's  I baccanali di Roma, one of his signature roles.  He spent his later years in Palazzolo sull'Oglio, his boyhood home. He died there in 1848 at the age of 75 and was buried in the town's cemetery.

Roles created
Roles sung by Bianchi in world premieres include:

Giacinto in Ferdinando Paer's L'amante servitore; Venice, Teatro San Moisè, 26 December 1796
Roberto in  Amor l'astuzia insegna; Venice, Teatro San Moisè, 18 January 1797
Florindo in Valentino Fioravanti's L'amor per interesse; Naples, Teatro del Fondo, 15 November 1797
Sebeto in Giacomo Tritto's Il disinganno; Naples, Teatro San Carlo, 22 July 1799
Segesto in Luigi Capotorti's Enea in Cartagine; Naples, Teatro San Carlo, 13 August 1799
Il Re in Domenico Cimarosa's Cantata per il fausto ritorno di Ferdinando IV, re delle Sicilie; Naples, Chiesa di Santa Maria della Vittoria, 23 September 1799
Roberto in Simon Mayr's Le finte rivali; Milan, Teatro alla Scala, 20 August 1803
Dorante in Niccolò Zingarelli's Il bevitore fortunato; Milan, Teatro alla Scala, 13 November 1803
Roberto in Carlo Bigatti's L'amante prigioniero; Milan, Teatro alla Scala, 6 May 1809
Ernesto in  Le rivali generose; Milan, Teatro alla Scala, 10 June 1809
Eraclito in Ercole Paganini's I filosofi al cimento; Milan, Teatro alla Scala, 5 June 1810
Duca Rambaldo in Giuseppe Farinelli's La contadina bizzarra; Milan, Teatro alla Scala, 16 August 1810
Baldassare in Gioachino Rossini's Ciro in Babilonia; Ferrara, Teatro Comunale, 14 March 1812
Cesare di Ferracuto in Pietro Guglielmi's La presunzione corretta; Milan, Teatro alla Scala, 19 April 1813
Alberto in Giuseppe Mosca's Avviso al pubblico; Milan, Teatro alla Scala, 4 January 1814
Egeo in Carlo Coccia's Teseo e Medea; Turin, Teatro Regio, 26 December 1815
Quinto Fabio Massimo in Stefano Pavesi's Le Danaidi romane; Venice, La Fenice, 5 December 1816
Atride in Francesco Basili's L'ira d'Achille; Venice, La Fenice, 30 January 1817
Retello in Giacomo Meyerbeer's Romilda e Costanza; Padua, Teatro Nuovo, 19 July 1817
Carlo di Svezia in Gioachino Rossini's Eduardo e Cristina; Venice, Teatro San Benedetto,  24 April 1819
Don Gusmano in Stefano Pavesi's Don Gusmano; Venice, Teatro San Benedetto, 1 June 1819
Norcesto in Giacomo Meyerbeer's Emma di Resburgo; Venice, Teatro San Benedetto, 26 June 1819
Bayardo in  Gastone e Bayardo; London, King's Theatre, 26 February 1820 
Olinto in Simon Mayr's Demetrio; Turin, Teatro Regio, 27 December 1823
Sulemano in Giovanni Tadolini's Almanzor; Trieste, Teatro Grande, 22 September 1827

Compositions
Bianchi composed a hymn for four voices and orchestra, "Al ciel sia lode", which was performed before King Ferdinand IV aboard Lord Nelson's ship in the Bay of Naples on 10 July 1799. He also wrote a collection of 12 pieces for singing students which was dedicated to Rossini and published posthumously in 1863. According to the Dizionario Biografico degli Italiani, some late 19th-century biographies of Bianchi have mistakenly attributed to him two further works by a Milanese composer with the same name: the one-act comic opera Gara d'amore and a reduction of Wagner's Das Liebesmahl der Apostel for voice and piano, both published by Stabilimento Musicale Francesco Lucca in 1873.

Notes

References

1773 births
1848 deaths
Italian operatic tenors
Voice teachers
Musicians from the Province of Bergamo